COGEN Europe is a European advocacy group based in Belgium that promotes the practice of cogeneration in energy production.  The group acts as a liaison between its member companies and European Union energy organizations and committees.

The managing director of COGEN Europe is also the coordinator of the ene.field project.

See also
 Combined Heat and Power Association

References

External links 

Trade associations based in Belgium
Cogeneration
International energy organizations